WBBB (96.1 FM "96.1 BBB"), is an adult hits radio station based in Raleigh, North Carolina, owned by Curtis Media Group.  Its studios are located in Raleigh, and the transmitter tower is near Garner close to Lake Wheeler.

History
The station was signed on in 1949 by the Raleigh News and Observer as WNAO-FM to simulcast sister station WNAO 850 AM. The stations were sold to Sir Walter Television effective February 13, 1953.  In 1955 the station became WKIX-FM, simulcasting much of sister AM WKIX's top 40 format. This move was out of necessity as WKIX (AM)'s 10 kW signal was powered down to a directional 5 kW at night, preventing the station from having full area coverage. In 1972, WKIX-FM changed format to easy listening WYYD.

In a change announced in March 1983, WYYD gave up its Carson Radio Services beautiful music format for a new sound without instrumentals described as "between beautiful music and adult contemporary" by general manager Ed Weiss. Burkhart, Abrams, Michaels, Douglas & Associates consulted on the format that included Neil Diamond, Barry Manilow, Barbra Streisand and Kenny Rogers and offered four songs in a row.

Two years later WYYD changed its letters to WYLT ("Lite 96.1"), playing soft adult contemporary music.

In 1992, WYLT had a disco show called "Saturday Night Fever" airing on Saturday evenings.

In 1993, WYLT as "Y-96" tried a variation of adult album alternative, playing traditional AC during the day and alternative rock at night, including artists such as Pearl Jam, 10,000 Maniacs, Shawn Colvin, John Hiatt, The Breeders, and R.E.M.  Several area college radio stations played alternative music, but WYLT was a commercial station and had a stronger signal.
 
WYLT started 1994 by stunting as "W-Garth", playing only Garth Brooks. The last song on Y-96 was "It's the End of the World as We Know It (And I Feel Fine)" by R.E.M". On January 5, WYLT traded call letters with WKIX; both stations were owned by Alchemy Communications. The FM station switched to country as a result of the increased popularity of WQDR-FM, but distinguished itself from its competitor with "country your grandparents just wouldn't understand." General manager Rennold Madrazo described the new sound as "very hot, high energy and uptempo, with lifestyle promotions" and targeting yuppies and other upscale listeners. The result was a decline in ratings, followed by a slight increase.

When the station switched to mainstream rock on January 28, 1998, the WBBB letters were taken from a Burlington, North Carolina radio station at 920 AM (which was concurrently renamed WPCM). WBBB was called "Real Rock, 96rock" then transitioned to "The Rock Station, 96rock". They later dropped the first half of their name and became known simply as 96rock and went by the motto "Everything That Rocks."

On November 21, 2011, at midnight, WBBB flipped to adult hits as "Radio 96.1: More Music, Less Blah, Blah, Blah" (the call letters reflecting this branding), playing music from the 1970s-2000s. The final song on 96Rock was Wild Side by Mötley Crüe, while the first song on Radio 96.1 was One Way or Another by Blondie.

In June 2012, Radio 96.1 became the highest-rated radio station amongst adults aged 25–54 in the Raleigh-Durham Arbitron market.

On April 3, 2017, WBBB rebranded as "96.1 BBB: Your Life. Your Music," with no other changes.

Previous logos

References

External links
Radio 96.1 Facebook page
Radio 96.1 Twitter page

BBB
Radio stations established in 1949
1949 establishments in North Carolina
Adult hits radio stations in the United States